Vishnevka is the name of several rural localities in Russia.

Modern localities

Altai Krai
As of 2012, one rural locality in Altai Krai bears this name:
Vishnevka, Altai Krai, a selo in Vishnevsky Selsoviet of Rubtsovsky District;

Amur Oblast
As of 2012, one rural locality in Amur Oblast bears this name:
Vishnevka, Amur Oblast, a selo in Annovsky Rural Settlement of Ivanovsky District

Republic of Bashkortostan
As of 2012, two rural localities in the Republic of Bashkortostan bear this name:
Vishnevka, Bizhbulyaksky District, Republic of Bashkortostan, a village in Kosh-Yelginsky Selsoviet of Bizhbulyaksky District
Vishnevka, Chishminsky District, Republic of Bashkortostan, a village in Ibragimovsky Selsoviet of Chishminsky District

Bryansk Oblast
As of 2012, one rural locality in Bryansk Oblast bears this name:
Vishnevka, Bryansk Oblast, a village under the administrative jurisdiction of Karachev Urban Administrative Okrug in Karachevsky District;

Chelyabinsk Oblast
As of 2012, one rural locality in Chelyabinsk Oblast bears this name:
Vishnevka, Chelyabinsk Oblast, a settlement in Nizhneustselemovsky Selsoviet of Uysky District

Republic of Crimea
As of 2012, one rural locality in Republic of Crimea bears this name:
Vishnevka, Republic of Crimea, a selo in Krasnoperekopsky District

Kaliningrad Oblast
As of 2012, two rural localities in Kaliningrad Oblast bear this name:
Vishnevka, Guryevsky District, Kaliningrad Oblast, a settlement in Dobrinsky Rural Okrug of Guryevsky District
Vishnevka, Slavsky District, Kaliningrad Oblast, a settlement in Yasnovsky Rural Okrug of Slavsky District

Kemerovo Oblast
As of 2012, one rural locality in Kemerovo Oblast bears this name:
Vishnevka, Kemerovo Oblast, a selo in Vishnevskaya Rural Territory of Belovsky District;

Kirov Oblast
As of 2012, one rural locality in Kirov Oblast bears this name:
Vishnevka, Kirov Oblast, a village in Sludsky Rural Okrug of Nemsky District;

Kurgan Oblast
As of 2012, two rural localities in Kurgan Oblast bear this name:
Vishnevka, Kargapolsky District, Kurgan Oblast, a village in Zauralsky Selsoviet of Kargapolsky District; 
Vishnevka, Petukhovsky District, Kurgan Oblast, a village in Novoberezovsky Selsoviet of Petukhovsky District;

Kursk Oblast
As of 2012, two rural localities in Kursk Oblast bear this name:
Vishnevka, Korenevsky District, Kursk Oblast, a village in Komarovsky Selsoviet of Korenevsky District
Vishnevka, Shchigrovsky District, Kursk Oblast, a settlement in Vishnevsky Selsoviet of Shchigrovsky District

Leningrad Oblast
As of 2012, two rural localities in Leningrad Oblast bear this name:
Vishnevka, Krasnoselskoye Settlement Municipal Formation, Vyborgsky District, Leningrad Oblast, a settlement in Krasnoselskoye Settlement Municipal Formation of Vyborgsky District; 
Vishnevka, Polyanskoye Settlement Municipal Formation, Vyborgsky District, Leningrad Oblast, a settlement in Polyanskoye Settlement Municipal Formation of Vyborgsky District;

Novgorod Oblast
As of 2012, one rural locality in Novgorod Oblast bears this name:
Vishnevka, Novgorod Oblast, a village in Ivanteyevskoye Settlement of Valdaysky District

Novosibirsk Oblast
As of 2012, one rural locality in Novosibirsk Oblast bears this name:
Vishnevka, Novosibirsk Oblast, a village in Kupinsky District;

Omsk Oblast
As of 2012, two rural localities in Omsk Oblast bear this name:
Vishnevka, Nizhneomsky District, Omsk Oblast, a village in Nizhneomsky Rural Okrug of Nizhneomsky District; 
Vishnevka, Sherbakulsky District, Omsk Oblast, a village in Izyumovsky Rural Okrug of Sherbakulsky District;

Orenburg Oblast
As of 2012, two rural localities in Orenburg Oblast bear this name:
Vishnevka, Buguruslansky District, Orenburg Oblast, a settlement in Sovetsky Selsoviet of Buguruslansky District
Vishnevka, Sharlyksky District, Orenburg Oblast, a settlement in Preobrazhensky Selsoviet of Sharlyksky District

Primorsky Krai
As of 2012, one rural locality in Primorsky Krai bears this name:
Vishnevka, Primorsky Krai, a selo in Spassky District

Rostov Oblast
As of 2012, five rural localities in Rostov Oblast bear this name:
Vishnevka, Fomino-Svechnikovskoye Rural Settlement, Kasharsky District, Rostov Oblast, a khutor in Fomino-Svechnikovskoye Rural Settlement of Kasharsky District; 
Vishnevka, Pervomayskoye Rural Settlement, Kasharsky District, Rostov Oblast, a khutor in Pervomayskoye Rural Settlement of Kasharsky District; 
Vishnevka, Morozovsky District, Rostov Oblast, a khutor in Volno-Donskoye Rural Settlement of Morozovsky District; 
Vishnevka, Rodionovo-Nesvetaysky District, Rostov Oblast, a khutor in Boldyrevskoye Rural Settlement of Rodionovo-Nesvetaysky District; 
Vishnevka, Zernogradsky District, Rostov Oblast, a khutor in Rossoshinskoye Rural Settlement of Zernogradsky District;

Ryazan Oblast
As of 2012, one rural locality in Ryazan Oblast bears this name:
Vishnevka, Ryazan Oblast, a village in Novoselkovsky Rural Okrug of Ryazansky District

Samara Oblast
As of 2012, one rural locality in Samara Oblast bears this name:
Vishnevka, Samara Oblast, a settlement in Koshkinsky District

Smolensk Oblast
As of 2012, two rural localities in Smolensk Oblast bear this name:
Vishnevka, Demidovsky District, Smolensk Oblast, a village in Kartsevskoye Rural Settlement of Demidovsky District
Vishnevka, Dukhovshchinsky District, Smolensk Oblast, a village under the administrative jurisdiction of Ozyornenskoye Urban Settlement in Dukhovshchinsky District

Tambov Oblast
As of 2012, three rural localities in Tambov Oblast bear this name:
Vishnevka, Rzhaksinsky District, Tambov Oblast, a village in Pustovalovsky Selsoviet of Rzhaksinsky District
Vishnevka, Sosnovsky District, Tambov Oblast, a settlement in Zelenovsky Selsoviet of Sosnovsky District
Vishnevka, Tambovsky District, Tambov Oblast, a settlement in Bolshelipovitsky Selsoviet of Tambovsky District

Volgograd Oblast
As of 2012, one rural locality in Volgograd Oblast bears this name:
Vishnevka, Volgograd Oblast, a settlement in Stepnovsky Selsoviet of Pallasovsky District

Voronezh Oblast
As of 2012, one rural locality in Voronezh Oblast bears this name:
Vishnevka, Voronezh Oblast, a settlement in Spasskoye Rural Settlement of Verkhnekhavsky District

Alternative names
Vishnevka, alternative name of Vishnevy, a settlement in Kirillovsky Rural Administrative Okrug of Klimovsky District in Bryansk Oblast;